Dysspastus lilliput is a moth of the family Autostichidae. It is found on Malta in the Mediterranean Sea.

References

Moths described in 1996
Dysspastus